Austria national field hockey team may refer to:
 Austria men's national field hockey team
 Austria women's national field hockey team